XHLTZ-FM is a radio station in Aguascalientes, Aguascalientes, Mexico. It broadcasts regional Mexican music on 106.1 FM as "La Ranchera".

History 
XELTZ-AM 740 received its concession on April 30, 1979. It moved from Loreto in two stages, first to El Puertecito de la Virgen, and then to Aguascalientes proper in December 2002.

XELTZ migrated to FM in 2010 and carried the FM Globo romantic format from MVS Radio and Radio Universal. In May 2011, the station was sold to Grupo Radiofónico ZER, which changed the station and renamed it La Tremenda. The present La Ranchera format was adopted in 2012.

References

Regional Mexican radio stations
Spanish-language radio stations
Radio stations in Aguascalientes
Mass media in Aguascalientes City